The Millicent Fawcett Mile is an annual one mile running race for women, inaugurated in 2018 at the Müller Anniversary Games held in London in July 2018.

The inaugural race was won by Sifan Hassan (Netherlands) in 4:14.71. There had been a women's mile event at previous games, without this title, the previous record being held by Hellen Obiri (Kenya) who ran in 2017 in 4:16.56 and came third in 2018 in 4:16.15.

The race name commemorates suffragist Millicent Fawcett, to commemorate the centenary of women's suffrage in the UK.

The winner of each race will sign a commemorative book, as has been the practice since 1953 for the  Emsley Carr Mile held at the same meeting.

Winners

References

Mile races
Recurring sporting events established in 2018
Athletics in London
Athletics in the United Kingdom
Women's athletics competitions